was a Japanese author, best known for writing male homosexual romances.

Early life and family 
Mari Mori was born in Hongō, Tokyo. Her father was novelist Mori Ōgai.

Career
Mori won the Japan Essayist Club Award in 1957 for a collection of essays called My Father's Hat. She  began a movement of writing about male homosexual passion (tanbi shousetsu, literally "aesthetic novels") in 1961 with A Lovers' Forest, which won the Tamura Toshiko Prize. Later works include I Don't Go on Sundays (1961) and The Bed of Dead Leaves (1962).

She was greatly influenced by her father; in A Lover's Forest, the older man can be seen as imbued with the same virtues and honor as she saw in her father. An older man and younger boy are trademarks of Mori Mari's work. The older man is extremely rich, powerful, wise, and spoils the younger boy. In The Lover's Forest, for example, the older man, Guido, is 38 or so, and Paulo is 17 or 18. (However, he is not yet 19, the age that Mori was when her father died). Paulo is extraordinarily beautiful, prone to lounge lazily, and has a lack of willpower in all but the field of his pleasure. (Guido dies when Paolo is 19, and Paulo subsequently falls in love with a man who's been waiting in the wings, another one just like Guido). New York University Professor Keith Vincent has called her a "Japanese Electra", referring to the Electra complex counterpart put forth by Carl Jung to Sigmund Freud's Oedipal complex.

In 1975 her  won the 3rd Izumi Kyōka Prize for Literature.

Personal life
Her first husband was Tamaki Yamada (1893-1943), an assistant professor of French literature and librarian at the Tokyo Imperial University who co-founded the University of Tokyo Buddhist Literature Department, whom she married in 1919 and divorced in 1927, having had two children. Her second husband was Akira Sato 佐藤彰.

Mori Mari died of heart failure on 6 June 1987.

References

External links 
 Summary of Prof. Keith Vincent's lecture at NYU (see 10 February)
 An interview with a Japanese writer who mentions Mori, centerforbookculture.org
 "Mari and Annu: Childhood Re-Imagined" Includes summary of a paper about Mori Ōgai's daughters (archived), aasianst.org
 The Room of Sweet Honey: The Adult Shoujo Fiction of Japanese Novelist Mori Mari (1903–1987)

Japanese writers
Japanese LGBT writers
1903 births
1987 deaths
Writers from Tokyo